JSCB "IMEXBANK" was one of the largest commercial banks in Ukraine based in the city of Odessa. It was founded on March 29, 1994. The bank's primary owner was Leonid Klimov. On January 27, 2015, the National Bank of Ukraine declared Imexbank insolvent and introduced a temporary administration for a period of three months.

On May 27, 2015, the Deposit Guarantee Fund of Ukraine made a decision to liquidate Imexbank.

History 
IMEXBANK was opened on March 29, 1994. In 1998, the bank expanded outside of Odesa region, having opened a branch in Kyiv.

In 2002, the bank received a license from the international payment system MasterCard International, opening branches in Dnipro, Zaporizhia, Mykolayiv and Rivne.

In 2003, IMEXBANK joined the international interbank payment system SWIFT. At the end of 2003, the bank served 5,000 legal entities and more than 150,000 individuals, and branches were opened in Ternopil, Vinnytsia and Kropyvnytskyi.

As of 2004, IMEXBANK had more than 200 branches in Ukraine.

In 2006, the first foreign offices were opened in Austria and South Africa, and the following year in Romania. The Bank developed operations with bank metals and expanded the range of coins made of precious metals.

As of 2010, the bank's capital reached UAH 990 million (approximately $120 million).

Due to financial crisis in Ukraine caused by Russia annexation of Crimea and War on Donbass, the bank was liquidated on May 27, 2015 by the decision of the National Bank of Ukraine.

On May 26, 2020, the Deposit Guarantee Fund of Ukraine sold at auction the Chornomorets Stadium, formerly owned by IMEXBANK to the american company "Allrise Capital", for UAH 193.8 million.

Membership
Europay International
MasterCard International
The Ukrainian interbank association of Europay International members 
The partner of Western Union company 
Association of National Large-Scale Electronic Payments System (NLEPS) participants 
Association of Ukrainian Banks (AUB) 
The Odessa Bank Union 
Professional Association of Registrars and Depositaries (PARD) 
Open-ended Society "Interregional Fund Union" (IFU) 
Contributions warranting fund for private entities 
The Ukrainian Interbank Currency Stock Exchange (UICSE)

Sponsors and Partners
FC Chornomorets Odessa is the bank's asset 
IMEXBANK is one of the cofounders of the Odessa Bank Union
First National Open-ended Pension Fund
PRIMORIE Insurance Company mutual cooperation
Black Sea Hotel (four star) mutual cooperation (10% off for the bank's clients)
Andromed Medical Centre

References

External links
 Official website  - inaccessible
 Official website 
 The main sponsor of FC Chornomorets Odessa 
 Listed in Ukraine 
 Location of the bank on wikimapia, the first skyscraper of Odessa 
 Brief profile 

Defunct banks of Ukraine
Banks established in 1994
Banks disestablished in 2015
1994 establishments in Ukraine
2015 disestablishments in Ukraine